Ssaki (English translation: Mammals) was a short film written and directed by Roman Polański in 1962. This was the last of Polański's short films before Knife in the Water, he began work on his first feature. Ssaki received awards at Oberhausen and Melbourne.

References

External links

Films directed by Roman Polanski
Films with screenplays by Roman Polanski
Polish short films
Polish independent films
1962 short films